Sohan Singh (born 15 September 1936) is an Indian diver. He competed in the men's 10 metre platform event at the 1964 Summer Olympics.

References

1936 births
Living people
Indian male divers
Olympic divers of India
Divers at the 1964 Summer Olympics
Place of birth missing (living people)